Celia Herrera Rodriguez (born November 26, 1952 in Sacramento, California) is an educator, painter, and performance and installation artist.

Biography 
Rodriguez is originally from Sacramento, California and she was born on November 26, 1952. She has taught programs including Chicano Studies at the University of California, Berkeley for seventeen years. She has also been an Adjunct Professor in the Diversity Studies program at California College for the Arts of the San Francisco Bay Area. Herrera Rodriguez is also the co-founder and co-director of Las Maestras Center for Xicana[x] Indigenous Thought, Art and Social Practice at UCSB, where she teaches Chicana[x] Art History and Studio Practice in the Department of Chicano and Chicana Studies.

Education 
Rodriguez received her B.A. in Art and Ethnic Studies from CSU-Sacramento. She also received her M.F.A. in Painting from the University of Illinois, Urbana-Champaign. She went on to study Art History, in 1987, Theory and Criticism at the Art Institute of Chicago.

Artworks

Un rezo en cuatro caminos 
This work was originated presented in III Bienal Internacional de Estandartes Tijuana 2004. Its title means " A Prayer on Four Roads".

The Hungry Woman: A Mexican Medea
This production was created by Cherrie Moraga in 2005, with Herrera Rodriguez creating the set and costume concepts.

A Prayer to the Mother Waters for Peace
The multimedia performance was created in 2006 and presented at the Glass Curtain Gallery, in Chicago, Illinois.

Exhibitions 
 2006- Sola, pero bien acompañada: III Bienal Internacional de Estandartes Tijuana 2004
 2010- La Semilla Caminante : Mission Cultural Center, San Francisco

Collections 
 The Triton Museum, Santa Clara
 Glass Curtain Gallery at Columbia College of Chicago
 CN Gorman Museum, UC-Davis
 The DeSaisset Museum at Santa Clara University
 The Institute of American Indian Art Museum in Santa Fe
 The Oakland Museum of California
 Tufts University Gallery 
 The Mexican Museum of San Francisco
 Name Gallery in Chicago

Publications 
Her series of artworks was published in 2011, in a collection of essays by Cherrie Moraga: “Xicana Codex of Changing Consciousness, Writing 2000- 2010". Alexander, Jacqui. “Pedagogies of Crossing.” Google Books, Duke University Press , 2005

Bibliography 
 Alexander, Jacqui. “Pedagogies of Crossing.” Google Books, Duke University Press , 2005
 Casiano, Catherine, and Elizabeth C. Ramirez. “La Voz Latina.” Google Books, University of Illinois Press, 2011
 Moraga, Cherríe, and Celia H. Rodriguez. A Xicana Codex of Changing Consciousness: Writings, 2000-2010. Durham, NC: Duke University Press, 2011. 
 Perez, Laura E. “Chicana Art.” Google Books, Duke University Press, 2007

References

External links 
  Latino Art Community : Celia Herrera Rodriguez
  Celia Herrera Rodriguez Profile
  Glass Curtain Gallery, Columbia College Chicago
  Galeria De La Raza

1952 births
Living people
American women educators
American women painters
California State University, Sacramento alumni
School of the Art Institute of Chicago alumni
University of Illinois at Urbana–Champaign School of Art and Design alumni
21st-century American women